The Dubinin Trough is an undersea trough named for Soviet Captain A.I. Dubinin, leader of the 1957 Antarctic expedition. The name was proposed by G. Agapova of the Geological Institute of the Russian Academy of Sciences, and it was approved by the Advisory Committee for Undersea Features in August 1985.

References 

Oceanic basins of the Southern Ocean